Portrait of a married couple in Suriname or Portrait of the married couple Johannes Ellis and Maria Louisa de Hart is a daguerreotype from probably 1846. As far as we know it is the oldest surviving photograph from Suriname.

The picture shows the 33 year old in Elmina born Johannes Ellis, extramarital son of the Dutchman Abraham de Veer and Fanny Ellis, and his 19 year old Surinamese wife Maria Louisa de Hart, a wealthy couple, dressed according to the latest fashion. De Hart was a daughter of the Jewish merchant Mozes Meijer de Hart, who came from Amsterdam, and a slave girl who was bought free by him in 1827. At the time the daguerreotype was made Maria Louisa was pregnant with her son, the first and only Surinamese minister in a Dutch cabinet: Abraham George Ellis.

According to family tradition, the portrait dates from 1845, the year of their engagement and marriage, but it was probably made in Paramaribo in the spring of 1846, when the American daguerreotypes John L. Riker and Warren Thompson independently visited the north coast of South America.

The original print of the photograph was on long-term loan from Mrs. J. Huisken to the Rijksmuseum in Amsterdam in 2009.

References

1840s photographs
Collections of the Rijksmuseum Amsterdam
Jewish Surinamese history
Portrait photographs